{{Infobox film
| name           = Freckles Comes Home
| image_size     =
| image	=	Freckles Comes Home FilmPoster.jpeg
| caption        =
| director       = Jean Yarbrough
| producer       = Lindsley Parsons (producer)
| writer         = {{ubl|Jeannette Stratton-Porter (novel Freckles Comes Home)|Edmond Kelso (screenplay)}}
| narrator       =
| starring       = See below
| music          =
| cinematography = Mack Stengler
| editing        = Jack Ogilvie
| distributor    = Monogram Pictures
| released       = 1942
| runtime        = 63 minutes
| country        = United States
| language       = English
| budget         =
| gross          =
}}Freckles Comes Home is a 1942 American film directed by Jean Yarbrough based on the novel by Jeannette Stratton-Porter that was a sequel to Freckles'' by her mother Gene Stratton-Porter.

Plot summary

Freckles Winslow (Johnny Downs) is on his way home from college. On the bus he encounters a crook, "Muggsy" Dolan who calls himself Jack Leach (Walter Sande). Jack is on the run from the law, and is looking for a safe place to hide. The two men come to talking and Freckles mentions his serene home town to Jack, having only good things to say about it. Jack decides to tag along and take his refuge in Freckles home town. With Freckles help he gets to stay at the local hotel, owned by Danny Doyle (Marvin Stephens), who is Freckles’ friend. Danny is about to rerun the road through town, so that it runs over a number of worthless lots of land he has bought. Danny bought the real estate because he thought he could find gold on them, using a new expensive device he has bought. Danny needs Freckles to help him get a favorable decision by Freckles’ father (Irving Mitchell), who is one of the two road commissioners.

When Jack's crooked friend Nate Quigley (Bradley Page) arrives in town, he pretends to be interested in buying lots from Danny, in order to pull a scam on him. Danny gets a green light for the road development, but Jack is found dead in his hotel room. Constable Weaver (Irving Bacon) gets suspicious. Freckles, who has fallen in love with Jane Potter (Gale Storm), his childhood friend, suspects the newcomer Quigley of the deed, but doesn't seem to convince anyone else.  Both constable Weaver and road commissioner Potter (John Ince) are fooled when two of Jack's old friends arrive in town, pretending to be FBI agents investigating Jack's death. Quigley and the two men then break in at the local bank. Freckles gets help from Danny to fix the car which the criminals are to use to escape, but the two crooks end up killing Quigley and take both Freckles and Jeff (Mantan Moreland), the hotel porter, hostage. The robbers manage to crash the car and the pursuing constable Weaver is able to arrest them. The road development then starts, and Danny's finances are saved by the reward for capturing the bank robbers. After this turn of events, Jane thinks of Freckles as a real hero.

Cast
Johnny Downs as "Freckles" Winslow
Gale Storm as Jane Potter
Mantan Moreland as Jeff - the Hotel Porter
Irving Bacon as Constable Caleb Weaver
Bradley Page as Nate Quigley
Marvin Stephens as Danny Doyle
Betty Blythe as Mrs. Minerva Potter
Walter Sande as "Muggsy" Dolan, aka Jack Leach
Max Hoffman Jr. as Hymie
John Ince as Hiram Potter
Laurence Criner as Roxbury B. Brown, III
Irving Mitchell as Mr. Winslow
Gene O'Donnell as Monk
Si Jenks as Lem Perkins

Soundtrack
Gale Storm and Johnny Downs - "Where We Dream Tonight" (Written by Eddie Cherkose as Edward Cherkose and Edward J. Kay as Edward Kay)
The Barndance Band - "Turkey in the Straw"
The Barndance Band - "Gwine to Rune All Night" aka "De Camptown Races" (Written by Stephen Foster)
The Barndance Band - "Oh! Susanna" (Written by Stephen Foster)
Gale Storm - "Swing a Little Jingle" (Written by Eddie Cherkose as Edward Cherkose and Edward J. Kay as Edward Kay)

External links

References

1942 films
1942 comedy films
1940s English-language films
Films based on American novels
Monogram Pictures films
American comedy films
American black-and-white films
Films directed by Jean Yarbrough
1940s American films